Dilweg is a surname. Notable people with the surname include:

Anthony Dilweg (born 1965), American football player
Gary T. Dilweg, (born 1937), American politician, teacher, and businessman
Lavern Dilweg (1903–1968), American lawyer, football player, and politician
Eleanor Coleman Dilweg (1905-1978), American Olympic swimmer; wife of Lavern Dilweg, mother of Gary T. Dilweg